Naku La() or Laduo La() is a mountain pass between Tibet Autonomous Region in China and Sikkim in India. Naku La has been a flashpoint for Indian and Chinese patrols and military infrastructure construction in the area.

References

Further reading 
 
 

Mountain passes of Sikkim
Mountain passes of Tibet
Mountain passes of China
Mountain passes of India
Mountain passes of the Himalayas
China–India border
Mangan district